Mitochondrial inner membrane protein OXA1L is a protein that in humans is encoded by the OXA1L gene located on 14q11.2.  The C-terminus of this protein interacts with mitochondrial ribosomes and helps insert both mitochondrial and nuclear produced proteins into the inner membrane of the mitochondria.

Reference 

Human proteins